Clyde Carney "Jack" Johnson (January 7, 1891 – June 25, 1927) was an American football, basketball, and baseball coach. Johnson served as the head football coach at Elon College—now known as Elon University—in Elon, North Carolina for one season, in 1919 season, compiling a record of 1–2.  He also coached baseball for five seasons at Elon and for two at the University of Colorado.

Johnson died on June 25, 1927 from complications following appendicitis surgery in Boulder, Colorado.

Head coaching record

Football

References

External links
 

1891 births
1927 deaths
American men's basketball players
Basketball coaches from North Carolina
Basketball players from North Carolina
Colorado Buffaloes baseball coaches
Elon Phoenix athletic directors
Elon Phoenix baseball coaches
Elon Phoenix baseball players
Elon Phoenix football coaches
Elon Phoenix men's basketball coaches
Elon Phoenix men's basketball players
People from Siler City, North Carolina
Deaths from appendicitis